The  is a hybrid diesel multiple unit (DMU) train type operated by East Japan Railway Company (JR East) on "resort train" services on scenic lines in Japan since October 2010.

Design
The HB-E300 series is based on the KiHa E200 hybrid DMU type introduced on the Koumi Line in 2007. One 2-car train is used on the Ōito Line; two 2-car trains are used on the Tsugaru and Ōminato Lines; and two 4-car trains are used on Gonō Line Resort Shirakami services, replacing earlier KiHa 48 DMU trainsets.

The use of hybrid technology is designed to reduce fuel consumption by 10% compared with the existing Resort Shirakami trains, reduce NOx emissions by 60%, and reduce noise levels by 20 dB while idling at stations and by 30 dB when accelerating from standstill.

Interior
The four-car Resort Shirakami sets include compartment accommodation.

2-car Resort View Furusato
The two-car train for the Ōito Line is branded . It was built by Tokyu Car Corporation in Yokohama, and delivered to Nagano in June 2010. The train entered revenue service on 2 October 2010.

Formation
The two-car Resort View Furusato set is formed as follows.

2-car Resort Asunaro

The two 2-car trains for the Tsugaru and Ōminato Lines are branded , named after Aomori's prefectural tree, known as Asunaro in Japanese.

Formation
The two-car Resort Asunaro sets are formed as follows.

Interior

Future 
The Hinabi set is scheduled to enter service in the final quarter of 2023, and the Satono set is scheduled to enter service in the first quarter of 2024.

4-car Resort Shirakami - Aoike

The four-car Resort Shirakami - Aoike train for use on the Gono Line was delivered from Tokyu Car's Yokohama factory to JR East's Akita Depot in September 2010. It entered service from 4 December 2010.

Formation
The four-car Resort Shirakami - Aoike set is formed as follows.

4-car Resort Shirakami - Buna

The four-car Resort Shirakami - Buna train for use on the Gono Line was built jointly by J-TREC (cars 1, 2, and 4) at its Yokohama factory and JR East's Akita Works (car 3) in 2016. The train entered service on 16 July 2016, replacing the earlier KiHa 48 four-car DMU trainset previously used. The exterior livery and interior design of this set was overseen by Ken Okuyama Design.

Formation
The four-car Resort Shirakami - Buna set is formed as follows with car 1 at the Akita/Aomori end.

4-car Kairi 

The four-car  train was announced by JR East in October 2018, developed around the cuisine of Niigata and Shonai, as well as the scenery of the Sea of Japan. The set features a different headlight design than older HB-E300 series sets. It was built by Niigata Transys in 2019, and entered revenue service on 5 October 2019.

Formation 
The Kairi set is formed as follows, with car 1 at the Sakata end.

Interior 
Each car features different internal facilities. Cars 1 and 3 are equipped with toilets. 

 Car 1 features 2+2 abreast reclining seating throughout; the seats are rotated approximately threedegrees toward the windows. 
 Car 2 is a compartment car, featuring eight semi-private compartments with four seats each, as well as a luggage compartment.
 Car 3 does not feature passenger accommodation; it features a service counter and a space for events.
 Car 4 is a dining car and features three sets of four-person seating bays, four sets of two-person seating bays, and two sets of two-person bench seats.

References

External links

 JR East press release announcing Resort View Furusato 
 JR East HB-E300 series (Japan Railfan Magazine) 

Hybrid multiple units of Japan
East Japan Railway Company
Train-related introductions in 2010
J-TREC multiple units
Niigata Transys rolling stock
Tokyu Car multiple units